Jeremy Hawk (20 May 1918 – 15 January 2002) was a character actor with a long career in music halls and on London's West End stage.

Early life
Hawk was born Cedric Joseph Lange in Johannesburg, South Africa; his father was a matinee idol who used the name Douglas Drew, and his mother, June, of Irish origin, was of the third generation of an acting family. After his parents' divorce and his mother's subsequent marriage to a wealthy Yorkshire wool merchant, he was educated at Harrow School. Already nicknamed "Hawk" because of the shape of his nose, Lange began using the name Jeremy Hawk on entering RADA. By his first wife, Tuli, he had a daughter, Berenice Hawk; he married secondly actress Joan Heal, with whom he had another daughter, the actress Belinda Lang.

Career
Hawk appeared on television as straight man to Benny Hill, Arthur Askey, Norman Wisdom and Sid Caesar as well as hosting the ITV programme Criss Cross Quiz and the junior version for children's television from 1957 to 1962. He later presented the improvisation comedy show Impromptu. He also appeared in several films, including Lucky Jim (1957). He found little other work though is remembered for a long running famous Cadbury's chocolate tropical style advert in the 1970s: "Nuts, who-le ha-zelnuts. Cadbury's take 'em and they cover 'em in chocolate". He died, aged 83, in Reading, Berkshire, survived by his third wife, Lisa.

Filmography
 The Goose Steps Out (1942) - A.D.C.
 The Peterville Diamond (1942) - Pierre
 Face the Music (1954) - Recording Technician
 A Stranger Came Home (1954) - Sgt. Johnson
 Mask of Dust (1954) - Martin - racer
 Who Done It? (1956) - Himself
 Lucky Jim (1957) - Bill Atkinson
 The 39 Steps (1959) - Theatre Compere (uncredited)
 Left Right and Centre (1959) - T.V. Interviewer
 Dentist in the Chair (1960) - Dental Instructor
 Dentist on the Job (1961) - Professor Lovitt
 Panic (1963) - Spike
 Mystery Submarine (1963) - Adm. Saintsbury
 Boy with a Flute (1964) Narrator.
 The Trygon Factor (1966) - Bank Manager
 Eskimo Nell (1975) - Vernon Peabody 
 Stealing Heaven (1988) - Ancient Priest
 Elizabeth (1998) - Bishop #2 (final film role)

References

External links
 

1918 births
2002 deaths
People educated at Harrow School
Alumni of RADA
English male comedians
English male film actors
English game show hosts
English male television actors
People from Johannesburg
People from Reading, Berkshire
20th-century English comedians
South African emigrants to the United Kingdom